3-Methylphenethylamine (3MPEA) is an organic compound with the chemical formula of .  3MPEA is a human trace amine associated receptor 1 (TAAR1) agonist, a property which it shares with its monomethylated phenethylamine isomers, such as amphetamine (α-methylphenethylamine), and  (a trace amine).

Very little data, even on toxicity, is available about its effects on humans other than that it is corrosive and activates the human TAAR1 receptor.

References

Phenethylamines
TAAR1 agonists
3-Tolyl compounds